The 1995–96 Serie A was the 26th season of the women's football top level league in Italy, and the 10th to be run under the auspices of the Italian Football Federation, through the Lega Nazionale Dilettanti (amateur division). ACF Agliana were the defending champions.

Verona Gunther secured the championship, with Carolina Morace winning the top scorer award for the ninth consecutive season.

Review
Agliana won the 1994–95 league title by five points from rivals Torres. In March 1995 they had been purchased by a wealthy celebrity German shepherd dog, Gunther IV, who became the honorary president.

Gunther IV resigned as Agliana's president in June 1995, when team captain Carolina Morace kissed controversialist politician Vittorio Sgarbi during a segment of the Il processo di Biscardi television programme. The decision of Maurizio Mian, who ran the Gunther Group controlling the dog's affairs, drew a withering response from Morace. Agliana's management swiftly broke off their connection with the Gunther Group, remarking: "these people have only one interest, that of advertising themselves".

Before the 1995–96 season, the Gunther Group instead sponsored Agliana's Serie A rivals Verona CF. The club became known as "Verona Gunther" and signed Italy women's national football team players Stefania Antonini, Manuela Tesse, Raffaella Salmaso, Adele Marsiletti and Florinda Ciardi. Carolina Morace also put her differences with Gunther IV aside and agreed to join the team.

Verona won the league and Sue Lopez characterised the ownership situation as: "Verona Gunther, who won the Italian Women's Championship in 1996, are sponsored by a group of pharmaceutical companies. For publicity purposes they appointed a dog, a German shepherd called Gunther IV, as 'president' of the club and he attends all matches as the 'club's benefactor'." A report in Die Tageszeitung was less charitable: "A fraudulent German shepherd haunts Italy's women's football and cannot get away from national player Morace".

Standings

References

External links
 Season on RSSSF

1995-96
1995–96 domestic women's association football leagues
Women
1